The Organ is a  elevation Navajo Sandstone summit located in Zion National Park, in Washington County of southwest Utah, United States. Neighbors include The Great White Throne, Cathedral Mountain, Angels Landing, Observation Point, and Cable Mountain. The Organ is
believed to have been named by Claud Hirschi and Ethelbert Bingham, residents of Rockville, on their 1916 trip with Methodist Minister Frederick Vining Fisher, who also named geographical formations in Zion. This geographical feature's descriptive name was officially adopted in 1934 by the U.S. Board on Geographic Names.

Climate
Spring and fall are the most favorable seasons to visit The Organ. According to the Köppen climate classification system, it is located in a Cold semi-arid climate zone, which is defined by the coldest month having an average mean temperature below , and at least 50% of the total annual precipitation being received during the spring and summer.

Gallery

See also
 Geology of the Zion and Kolob canyons area
 Colorado Plateau

References

External links

 Zion National Park National Park Service
 Localized weather forecast
 The Organ rock climbing: mountainproject.com

Mountains of Utah
Zion National Park
Mountains of Washington County, Utah
Sandstone formations of the United States